Armigeres (Armigeres) aureolineatus is a species complex of zoophilic mosquito belonging to the genus Armigeres. It is found in Sri Lanka, India, Malaya, Cambodia, Laos, Nepal, Philippines, Vietnam, Thailand, Indochina, China, and Borneo. Larvae are collected from discarded containers, coconut shells and dirty water pools. It is known as a vector for avian diseases and few mammalian diseases.

References

External links
Mosquito (Diptera: Culicidae) fauna in Alappuzha and Kottayam district of the Kerala state, south India
Description of the pupae of five species in the subgenus Armigeres, genus Armigeres Theobald, with a key to species of the known pupae of the subgenus (Diptera: Culicidae).
FURTHER OBSERVATIONS ON THE MOSQUITO FAUNA OF UDAWATTAKELE FOREST, SRI LANKA.

aureolineatus
Insects described in 1908